Illa de Tagomago is a private island off the east coast of Ibiza belonging to Spain.

The etymology is likely from tagomago meaning "rock Mago" in reference to Mago Barca, a brother of the Carthaginian general Hannibal. In the Muslim era it was known as Taj Umayu.

It is 1,525 m long and 113 m wide. The island is rocky, with a port and a lighthouse in the extreme southeast. The Tagomago lighthouse was built in 1913 and is a landmark in the shipping routes from Ibiza to Palma de Mallorca and Barcelona. It is 86.3 m above sea level, and its height is 20.4 m.

The island is privately owned by a Spanish family, and has a small tourist facility that politicians and celebrities frequently visit.

Tago Mago, the second studio album by German krautrock band Can, was named after the island.

References

Islets of Ibiza
Uninhabited islands of Spain
Private islands of Europe